Saifee Nagar railway station (station code: SFNR) is a local railway station in Nandanvan Colony, Indore.

Station on the Delhi–Hyderabad metre-gauge line that was founded in the 1970s.

Saifee Nagar has been connected to Indore and Khandwa by metre-gauge railway lines. In 2008, the Union Cabinet approved the gauge conversion for the Ratlam–Mhow–Khandwa–Akola railway line.(472.64 km). The cost of the gauge conversion would be about Rs.1421.25 crore.

Major trains
The following trains have stoppage at the station.

Suburban trains

The Indore Suburban Railway is a commuter rail system serving the Indore Metropolitan Region. It is operated by Indian Railways' zonal Western Railways (WR). It has the highest passenger density of any urban railway system in Madhya Pradesh. The trains plying on its routes are commonly referred to as local trains or simply as locals.

See also
 Akola–Ratlam line (metre gauge)

References

External links
Ratlam Division, WR Website 

Railway junction stations in Madhya Pradesh
Railway stations in Indore
Ratlam railway division
Railway stations opened in 1988
1988 establishments in India
Buildings and structures in Indore